The 2017 Camping World 500 was a Monster Energy NASCAR Cup Series race held on March 19, 2017, at Phoenix International Raceway in Avondale, Arizona. Contested over 314 laps, extended from 312 laps due to overtime, on the  oval, it was the fourth race of the 2017 Monster Energy NASCAR Cup Series season.

Report

Background

Phoenix International Raceway, also known as PIR, is a one-mile, low-banked tri-oval race track located in Avondale, Arizona. The motorsport track opened in 1964 and currently hosts two NASCAR race weekends annually. PIR has also hosted the IndyCar Series, CART, USAC and the Rolex Sports Car Series. The raceway is currently owned and operated by International Speedway Corporation.

Entry list

First practice

Qualifying

He said after his run he believed he "had a pretty good (Turns) 1 and 2, I was able to hook the bottom. (Turns) 3 and 4 is where nothing went right. I didn’t think it was going to be quite good enough. I pushed as hard as I could. Sometimes you overdrive it a little bit and you can still make some speed. Proud of this team and proud of the all-Ford front row. That’s a pretty special deal.”

Qualifying results

Practice (post-qualifying)

Second practice

Final practice

Race

First stage
Joey Logano led the field to the green flag at 3:48 p.m. It remained caution-free until Corey LaJoie slammed the wall in the dogleg on the backstretch on lap 26, bringing out the first caution of the race.

The race restarted on lap 33. The uneventful stage concluded on lap 75 when Logano took the stage victory and the second caution flew at its conclusion. Kurt Busch's team was changing a battery, sent him out to beat the pace car off pit road so as to not lose a lap. He was busted for speeding in the process and held a lap on pit road.

Second stage
The race restarted on lap 86. Chase Elliott passed Logano going into Turn 1 on the restart to take the lead the following lap. The third caution flew on lap 118 when LaJoie slammed the wall in Turn 1. Aric Almirola and Logano restarted the race from the tail end of the field for speeding on pit road.

The race restarted on lap 123. It went green the rest of the stage, Elliott scored the stage victory and the fourth caution flew to conclude the second stage.

Final stage

The race restarted on lap 158. Matt Kenseth suffered a right-front tire blowout and slammed the wall in Turn 4, bringing out the fifth caution with 120 laps to go. Kyle Busch exited pit road with the race lead.

The race restarted with 112 to go. The sixth caution flew with 106 to go when David Ragan cut his left-rear tire and spun out, collecting Gray Gaulding to his outside in Turn 1.

The race restarted with 100 to go. Cole Whitt brought out the seventh caution with 55 to go when he slammed the wall in Turn 2. Ryan Blaney restarted the race from the tail end of the field for speeding on pit road.

The race restarted with 51 to go. Busch had the race in check until Logano suffered a right-front tire blowout – stemming from brake problems – and slammed the wall in Turn 1, bringing out the eighth caution with six to go. Ryan Newman chose not to pit and assumed the race lead along with Ricky Stenhouse Jr., and Martin Truex Jr. Kyle Larson exited pit road first among the cars that opted to pit.

Overtime
Newman powered ahead of Larson on the final restart. Larson came down on Ricky Stenhouse Jr. to his inside and got loose. This allowed Newman to drive on to victory.

Post-race

Driver comments
Newman said that this win was "sweet for so many reasons. I said that when I won the Brickyard. I said that when I won at Daytona. This has been the longest drought I’ve ever been in. … It’s just a hard‑fought race, a hard‑fought battle, a hard‑fought four years.”

Race results

Stage results

Stage 1
Laps: 75

Stage 2
Laps: 75

Final stage results

Stage 3
Laps: 164

Race statistics
 Lead changes: 8 among different drivers
 Cautions/Laps: 8 for 45
 Red flags: 0
 Time of race: 3 hours, 0 minutes and 41 seconds
 Average speed:

Media

Television
Fox Sports covered their 13th race at the Phoenix International Raceway. Mike Joy, two-time Phoenix winner Jeff Gordon and Darrell Waltrip had the call in the booth for the race. Jamie Little, Vince Welch and Matt Yocum handled the pit road duties for the television side.

Radio
MRN had the radio call for the race which also was simulcasted on Sirius XM NASCAR Radio.

Standings after the race

Drivers' Championship standings

Manufacturers' Championship standings

Note: Only the first 16 positions are included for the driver standings.

References

Camping World 500
Camping World 500
Camping World 500
NASCAR races at Phoenix Raceway